Year 1030 (MXXX) was a common year starting on Thursday (link will display the full calendar) of the Julian calendar.

Events 
 By place 
 Byzantine Empire 
 Emperor Romanos III Argyros decides to retaliate upon the incursions of the Muslims on the eastern frontier. He leads a Byzantine expeditionary force (20,000 men) to secure Antioch. The Mirdasid emir Shibl al-Dawla Nasr of Aleppo sues for peace, but Romanos refuses to negotiate and leads his army against Aleppo, against the advice of his generals. The Byzantine army encamps near Azaz, where they are encircled by the Mirdasids' Bedouin troops, who cut off the Byzantines from food and water. 
 10 August – Romanos orders a retreat to Antioch. As the army is exhausted from the heat and the lack of supplies, the retreat soon turns into a flight in panic. Romanos returns to Constantinople in humiliation but his generals on the eastern frontier manage to salvage the situation: a Fatimid attack on Maraclea is repulsed, and Azaz itself is captured in December after a brief siege. In April/May 1031, Emir Nasr of Aleppo agreed to vassal and tributary status with Byzantium.

 Europe 
 June – Emperor Conrad II (the Elder) leads an invasion into Hungary. He plunders the lands west of the River Rába, but suffers from consequences of the scorched earth tactics used by the Hungarians. Conrad, threatened by starvation, is forced to retreat back to Germany. King Stephen I pursues his forces, which are defeated and captured by the Hungarians at Vienna.
 July 29 – Battle of Stiklestad: King Olaf II Haraldsson (St. Olaf) attempts to reconquer Norway with help from King Anund Jakob of Sweden. He is defeated by a superior Norwegian peasant and Danish army (14,000 men). Olaf is killed in the battle, he is later canonized and becomes the patron saint of Norway and Rex perpetuum Norvegiae ('the eternal king of Norway').
 The first mention is made of Tartu, Estonia, as Grand Prince Yaroslav I (the Wise) of Novgorod and Kiev defeats the Estonians, and founds a fort named Yuryev (modern-day Tartu). The Rus' will hold the fortress for the next 30 or 31 years.
 The first mention is made of Thalwil, Switzerland, which is derived from Tellewilare, and indicates the early medieval origins of Thalwil as an Alemannic farmstead.
 Henry I revolts against his father King Robert II (the Pious) in a civil war over power and property. Robert's army is defeated, and he retreats to Beaugency.

 Asia 
 April 30 – Sultan Mahmud of Ghazni dies after a 28-year reign. He is succeeded by his son Mas'ud I who seizes the throne of the Ghaznavid Empire, which includes much of Afghanistan, Iran and India.
 Ouyang Xiu, a Chinese historian and scholar, obtains his jinshi degree at the age of 23, by passing the imperial examinations in the country, leading him into a distinguished path as a scholar-official.
 The Chola Empire reaches its greatest extent.

Births 
 July 21 – Kyansittha, king of the Pagan Empire (Burma)
 July 26 – Stanislaus of Szczepanów, bishop of Kraków (d. 1079)
 Adelaide of Eilenburg, German noblewoman (approximate date)
 Anne of Kiev, French queen and regent (approximate date)
 Baldwin VI (the Good), count of Flanders (approximate date)
 Bruno of Cologne, founder of the Carthusian Order (d. 1101)
 Gerard (the Great), duke of Lorraine (approximate date)
 Gertrude of Saxony, countess of Holland (approximate date)
 Manegold of Lautenbach, German priest (approximate date)
 Romanos IV, emperor of the Byzantine Empire (d. 1072)
 Vsevolod I Yaroslavich, Grand Prince of Kiev (d. 1093)
 Walter of Pontoise, French abbot (approximate date)
 William of Hirsau, German abbot (approximate date)

Deaths 
 January 10 – Thietmar, margrave of the Saxon Ostmark
 January 31 – William V (the Great), duke of Aquitaine (b. 969)
 March 10 – Welf II, German nobleman (Elder House of Welf)
 April 30 – Mahmud of Ghazni, Ghaznavid emir (b. 971)
 July 19 – Adalberon, French bishop and poet (or 1031)
 July 29 
 Bjørn Stallare, Norwegian servant and diplomat
 Olaf II Haraldsson (St. Olaf), king of Norway
 Torstein Knarresmed, Norwegian Viking warrior
 Al-Musabbihi, Fatimid historian and official (b. 977)
 Cú Mara mac Maic Liac, Irish poet and Chief Ollam
 Fan Kuan, Chinese landscape painter (approximate date)
 Gormflaith ingen Murchada, Irish queen (b. 960)
 Krešimir III, king of Croatia (Trpimirović Dynasty)
 Miskawayh, Persian official and philosopher (b. 932)
 Skapti Þóroddsson, Icelandic lawspeaker and skald
 Tadg in Eich Gil, king of Connacht (approximate date)
 William IV, count of Provence (approximate date)

References